Grimmet is an unincorporated community in western Howell County, Missouri, United States. The community is located approximately one mile north of Tabor Creek, south of Missouri Route 14 and about 3.5 miles east of Siloam Springs.

History
A post office called Grimmet was established in 1893, and remained in operation until 1937. The community was named after Samuel Grimmett, a settler who was credited with securing the town a post office.

References

Unincorporated communities in Howell County, Missouri
Unincorporated communities in Missouri